Smeaton also Smeton or Smieton is a surname. Notable people with the surname include:

 Alan Smeaton, Irish author and academic
 Bruce Smeaton, Australian composer
 Cooper Smeaton, Canadian ice hockey referee and coach
 George Smeaton (footballer) (1917–1978), Australian footballer
 George Smeaton (theologian) (1814–1889), Scottish theologian
 John Smeaton  (1724–1792), English civil engineer
 John Smeaton (umpire), Australian cricket umpire
 John Smeaton (born 1976), Scottish baggage handler who assisted police during the 2007 Glasgow International Airport attack
 Mark Smeaton, English alleged royal adulterer
 Thomas Smeaton, also Thomas Smeton or Smieton, (1536–1583) a Scottish minister and Principal of Glasgow University
 Thomas Drury Smeaton (c. 1831–1908), banker and amateur scientist in South Australia
 Thomas Hyland Smeaton (c. 1857–1927), South Australian politician
 William Henry Oliphant Smeaton (1856–1914) Scottish writer